The 2022 Japan Rugby League One – Division 1 was the inaugural season of Japan's new professional three-tier Rugby union competition. It consisted of twelve franchises and played five teams twice and six teams once resulting in each team playing a total of sixteen games home and away. The top four sides at the end of the regular season contested the annual play-offs, whilst the bottom three sides went into a promotion and relegation playoff against the top three sides from the 2022 Japan Rugby League One – Division 2. The champions were the Saitama Wild Knights for the second season in a row. They beat Tokyo Sungoliath in the final 12–18.

Teams and personnel 
A total of twelve teams will participate in the inaugural Division 1 season:

Ladder

Fixtures 
Each team were to play five teams twice and six teams once for a total of sixteen home and away matches.

Relegation play-offs 
The relegation play-offs took place on 20 and 28 May 2022.

Overview

Matches 
All times Japan Standard Time (JST) (UTC+9)

Green Rockets v Honda Heat

Green Rockets won 55–34 on aggregate, and therefore both clubs remained in their respective leagues.

Shining Arcs v Mitsubishi DynaBoars

Mitsubishi DynaBoars won 44–66 on aggregate, and replaced the Shining Arcs in the Japan Rugby League One – Division 1

Season play-offs 
Bracket

Semi-finals

Third place play-off

Final

Statistics 
The statistics do not include any additional points, tries, etc. that may have been acquired in play-off matches.

Source: league-one.jp

Source: league-one.jp

International players 
The Japan Rugby League One holds a foreign player quota. Each Division 1 side are allowed a maximum of three “Category C” players: players who have represented a national team in international rugby that isn't Japan. The Japan Rugby League One also has two other categories of player (A, B), however, there is no limit on the number each team can have for those two category's.

Notes

References

External links 
 Japan Rugby League One site

2022–23 in Japanese rugby union
2022
Japan Rugby League One